The Palm Treo Pro is a combination PDA/cell phone offered in both GSM and CDMA. It is Palm's fourth Windows Mobile Treo. It replaced the short-lived Sprint Treo 800w.

Specifications 

The phone originally was released in an unlocked GSM format. The updated release of the phone for CDMA networks featured new hardware specifications including a more powerful processor, more storage, and less user-available RAM.

Mobile phone, CDMA model with 800/1900-MHz bands, with EV-DO Rev.A data.  Unlocked GSM model also available
Built-in GPS with both Assisted and Standalone modes
Qualcomm Dual-Core MSM7501A at 528 MHz processor (400 MHz Qualcomm on GSM networks)
300 MB user-available non-volatile storage (105 MB on GSM networks)
128 MB DDR RAM (approximately 65 MB user-available on GSM, 45 MB user-available on CDMA)
Windows Mobile 6.1 Professional
2.36 in (W) x 4.49 in (L) x 0.53 in (D)
4.69 ounces
320x320 TFT flush touchscreen display
Supports MicroSD and MicroSDHC cards up to 32 GB
Built-In Bluetooth 2.0 EDR with stereo support
2-megapixel digital camera
Built-in 802.11b/g Wi-Fi
1500mAh Rechargeable Lithium-ion battery.
Infrared port
Current CDMA Firmware: Version 1.04

Features
The Treo Pro supports A2DP, which allows the user to stream music to a supported device wirelessly over Bluetooth.  In addition the device comes with a 3.5mm standard headphone jack.  The GSM version of the phone comes packed with a stereo-headset, while the CDMA phone does not.  The battery is removable.

The touchscreen is flush with the surface of the phone, a first in the Palm line of products.  The full QWERTY keyboard is in the same style as that of the Palm Centro, with a textured, rubberized feel.  It is roughly 10% wider than the Centro's keyboard.

The familiar ringer switch is located, as expected, on the top of the device.  It switches the phone from having sounds on to a vibrate only mode instantly.

Carriers

GSM: Vodafone (UK), Telstra (Australia)
Vodafone (UK) was the first carrier to officially use the Treo Pro.  Also: Telstra (Australia) & Telecom NZ (from May 2009) although the phone is available unlocked as well. M1 (Singapore) began selling the Treo Pro in 2010.

CDMA: Bell Mobility & Telus (Canada), Alltel, Sprint Nextel (US)
Bell Mobility & Telus in Canada, and Alltel and Sprint Nextel in the US, picked up the Treo Pro in March 2009. The device could also be purchased at list price (about $450) and used on Verizon's network in the US.

References

Windows Mobile Professional devices
Palm mobile phones
Mobile phones with an integrated hardware keyboard